Royalty International – EP is an extended play by American singer Chris Brown. It was released on Christmas Day, by RCA Records. At first it was available only for digital download in United Kingdom, Ireland, New Zealand, Canada and Australia, later it was released worldwide on every streaming platform.

Background
Initially, Brown's intention was to release two different versions of his seventh studio album, Royalty, including an "international" version where some R&B tracks were replaced by uptempo pop-leaning songs, but eventually the international version was scrapped, and he ended up releasing some of these tracks on an EP titled Royalty International.

Track listing

References

External links
 

2015 debut EPs
RCA Records albums
Chris Brown albums
Albums produced by Scott Storch